Pierre Bouchet (6 January 1752 – 6 January 1794) was a French physician born in Lyon.

Biography
He was trained in medicine in Paris as Pierre-Joseph Desault's pupil then came home in Lyon Hôtel-Dieu where he became Head Surgeon.

He was the first in France to modify then use a knotted-string snare device to ligate and remove uterus and vagina polyps.

He also practiced internal necrosis surgery and tibia drilling.

His son, Claude-Antoine Bouchet, was the first, in France, to ligate external iliac artery to cure groin aneurysm.

Pierre Bouchet was always kind and good-hearted, so that his fellow citizens held him in the highest regard and esteem. He suffered a stroke and died under arrest on 1794 physically and psychologically exhausted by the Revolutionary armies siege of Lyon after the Revolt of the city against the National Convention.

References

1752 births
1794 deaths
18th-century French physicians
Physicians from Lyon
French surgeons